Cars Quatre Roues Rallye, or Cars Race Rally, is an attraction at Walt Disney Studios Park at Disneyland Paris in Marne-la-Vallée. The attraction opened on June 9, 2007, as part of the park's expansion land, Toon Studio (now known as Worlds of Pixar). The attraction's theme is based on Disney·Pixar's Cars franchise. On August 27, 2021, following Disneyland Paris' reopening, Walt Disney Studios announced that the attraction was set to become part of the Worlds of Pixar area.

Summary
The attraction is located in Toon Studio and themed as an automobile service station in Radiator Springs. The attraction is surrounded by boulders which imitate the rocky formations of the Grand Canyon. 

Similarly to Francis' Ladybug Boogie at Disney California Adventure and Whirlpool at Tokyo DisneySea, the ride system is a standard 2-table Zamperla Demolition Derby. The vehicles automatically change from one spinning turntable to the next while interweaving and switching places with the other vehicles.

This attraction eventually led to Walt Disney Imagineering creating a custom-made 3-table version with modified swinging vehicles at several DisneyParks, including: Mater's Junkyard Jamboree, Alien Swirling Saucers, and The Happy Ride With Baymax.

References

Amusement rides introduced in 2007
Quatre Roues Rallye
Walt Disney Studios Park
Pixar in amusement parks
Toon Studio (Walt Disney Studios Park)
Amusement rides manufactured by Zamperla
2007 establishments in France